The 2015 Nigeria Professional Football League (referred to as the Nigerian Glo premier league for sponsorship reasons) is the 44th season of the Nigeria Premier League, the top Nigerian professional league for association football clubs, since its establishment in 1972, and the 25th since the rebranding of the league as the "Professional League".

Enyimba won their seventh league title and first since the 2009–10 season. They clinched with a week to go in the season with a scoreless draw with Warri Wolves, who were six points behind. Warri Wolves finished in second place, four points behind Enyimba, and both will represent Nigeria in the 2016 CAF Champions League. Nasarawa United placed third and qualified for the 2016 CAF Confederation Cup.

Bayelsa United, Kwara United, Sharks and Taraba each finished in the bottom four and will be relegated to the Nigeria National League for 2016. Akwa United escaped relegation, pulling out of the bottom four with a 1-0 win over Lobi Stars in their final match of the season.

Clubs
A total of 20 teams will contest the league including 16 teams from the previous season and four teams promoted from the Nigeria National League. The four promoted teams replace Gombe United, Crown, Kaduna United and Nembe City who were all relegated to the National League at the end of the previous season

Teams

Stadiums and locations

Table

News 
Five Kano Pillars players were injured during an armed robbery as the club was heading south for their opener against Heartland FC.
Their opening game was postponed indefinitely.

In June, the league forced several clubs to find new venues for Matchdays 12 and 13 while they make mandatory upgrades to their home grounds.

In August, Kano Pillars' 12-year undefeated streak at home came to an end in a 2-1 loss to Nasarawa United.

References 

http://npfl.ng/

Nigeria Professional Football League seasons
Nigeria
1